Braytim is a district of Timișoara. It is located in the southern part of the city, being the first residential district built in Timișoara after 1989. Its name comes from the construction company that built the first houses here. The Triade Park is located in this district; it features works by Hungarian sculptor  and other local artists.

References 

Districts of Timișoara